Henry Cobham may refer to:

 Henry de Cobham, 1st Baron Cobham (1260–1339), English peer
 Henry Cobham (diplomat) (1537–1592), English MP for Kent
 Henry Brooke, 11th Baron Cobham (1564–1618), English peer